The 2017–18 season was Valencia Club de Fútbol's 98th in the club's history and their 83rd in La Liga.
This article shows player statistics and all matches (official and friendly) that the club played during the 2017–18 season.

Squad

Out on loan

Transfers

In

Total spend: €37,000,000

Out

Net income: €17,200,000

Statistics

Appearances and goals
Last updated on 20 May 2018

|-
! colspan=14 style=background:#dcdcdc; text-align:center|Goalkeepers

|-
! colspan=14 style=background:#dcdcdc; text-align:center|Defenders

|-
! colspan=14 style=background:#dcdcdc; text-align:center|Midfielders

|-
! colspan=14 style=background:#dcdcdc; text-align:center|Forwards

|-
! colspan=14 style=background:#dcdcdc; text-align:center| Players who have made an appearance or had a squad number this season but have been loaned out or transferred
|-

|-
|}

Cards
Accounts for all competitions. Last updated on 19 December 2017.

Clean sheets
Last updated on 19 December 2017

Competitions

Overview

La Liga

Standings

Results summary

Result round by round

Matchday

Copa del Rey

Round of 32

Round of 16

Quarter-finals

Semi-finals

References

External links
Club's official website

Valencia
Valencia CF seasons